Stay Free! was a non-profit magazine about the politics of culture based in Brooklyn, New York.

History 
Founded by Carrie McLaren in 1993 while working at Matador Records, it tends to focus on "the perversions of media and consumer culture."  Each issue has a theme, such as pranks, copyright, or marketing and past issues have included interviews with Lawrence Lessig, Negativland, Stuart Ewen, and Public Enemy.

In March 2007, Carrie McLaren announced Stay Free! would no longer be published in print, though they would continue online. The last print issue appeared in 2008. The website is no longer online. In 2009, the editors of Stay Free! released the book Ad Nauseam: A Survivor's Guide to American Consumer Culture.

The name was intended as an ironic homage to Stayfree maxipads, though it is also the title of a song by The Clash.

Other projects
To protest the expansion of copyright law, the magazine sponsored the Illegal Art exhibition, website and compact disc, all featuring artists challenging copyright or art works which were the subject of copyright suits.  Stay Free! also published a free media literacy curriculum.

Distribution
Stay Free! was distributed in the coffee shops, book shops, and other commercial venues of Brooklyn. One magazine cost $2.95.

See also
 Adbusters
 The Baffler

References

External links
 Official website (archive)

Anti-consumerist groups
Defunct political magazines published in the United States
Magazines established in 1993
Magazines disestablished in 2008
Magazines published in New York City
Online magazines published in the United States
Online magazines with defunct print editions